Paraithurainathar Temple is a Hindu temple in the town of Thirupparaithurai, Karur district of Tamil Nadu, India. The presiding deity Paraithurainathar is revered in Tevaram, written by Tamil saint poets known as the nayanmars and classified as Paadal Petra Sthalam. The temple gives its name to the village of Thirupparaithurai. The temple is famed for the legend of Shiva teaching lesson to hermits.

The temple is a part of the series of temples built by Cholas along the banks of river Kaveri. It has several inscriptions dating back to the Chola period. The temple has six daily rituals at various times from 6:00 a.m. to 8 p.m., and many yearly festivals on its calendar. The annual Brahmotsavam (prime festival) during Vaikasi (May–June) and Aippasi Thulastam are the major festivals of the temple. The temple is maintained and administered by the Hindu Religious and Endowment Board of the Government of Tamil Nadu.

Legend

As per Hindu legend, the hermits in Tharuka forest considered themselves to superior to all beings. They also felt they need not worship Shiva. The wives of the hermits considered themselves to be the chaste. Shiva wanted to teach them a lesson. He appeared in the forest as Bhikshatana and all wives of the hermits were attracted towards him. Shiva also sent Vishnu as Mohni in Mohni alangaram and all the hermits were attracted towards her. Shiva and Vishnu appeared in their natural form and the hermits repented their mistakes. Since Shiva appeared in Tharuka forest, he came to be known as Paraithurainathar.

Architecture 
The temple is located in Thirupparaithurai, a village located 16 km awy from Trichy on the Trichy - Karur highway. The temple has a flat primary entrance tower which has the temple tank on the western side. The temple has a seven-tiered temple tower. The temple has two precincts. The sanctum is approached through the flag post, pillared halls, Ardhamandapam and mahamandapam. The sanctum houses the image of Tharukavaneswar in the form of  Lingam (an iconic form of Shiva). There are shrines of Vinayagar, Murugan with Valli & Deivanai, Mahalakshmi and Vishnu Durgai. The images of Brahma, Lingodhbhavar and Dakshinamurthy are located in the planks around the sanctum. The sanctum is guarded by Dvarapalas and the images various deities are depicted in the nearby wall. In the halls in the first precinct, there are images of various Hindu deities. All the shrines of the temple are enclosed by large granite walls around both sanctums.

Worship and religious practices 

It is one of the shrines of the 275 Paadal Petra Sthalams. The temple priests perform the puja (rituals) during festivals and on a daily basis. Like other Shiva temples of Tamil Nadu, the priests belong to the Shaiva community, a Brahmin sub-caste. The temple rituals are performed six times a day; Ushathkalam at 5:30 a.m., Kalasanthi at 8:00 a.m., Uchikalam at 10:00 a.m., Sayarakshai at 5:00 p.m., Irandamkalam at 7:00 p.m. and Ardha Jamam at 8:00 p.m. Each ritual comprises four steps: abhisheka (sacred bath), alangaram (decoration), naivethanam (food offering) and deepa aradanai (waving of lamps) for both Paraithurainathar and Pasumpon Mayilambigai Amman. The worship is held amidst music with nagaswaram (pipe instrument) and tavil (percussion instrument), religious instructions in the Vedas (sacred texts) read by priests and prostration by worshippers in front of the temple mast. Vaikasi Brahmotsavam and Aippasi Thula stanam are the most important festivals of the temple.

References

External links

Hindu temples in Tiruchirappalli district
Padal Petra Stalam